Miss Yesterday is a 2004 play by British playwright Alan Ayckbourn. It was, like My Sister Sadie shown the previous year, billed as a "family" play in the Stephen Joseph Theatre's Christmas production. It is about a teenage girl who is sent back in time one day to prevent the death of her older brother in a motorcycle accident.

Though still unpublished, the play was performed by amateurs in the studio of the York Theatre Royal in March 2012.

References

External links
Miss Yesterday on official Ayckbourn site
Guardian review, December 2004
Theatre BA review

2004 plays
Plays by Alan Ayckbourn